Mammad is a given name and surname, commonly found in the Azerbaijani-language. Notable people with the name include:

Given name 
 Mammad Amin Rasulzadeh (1884–1955), Azerbaijani politician
 Mammad Araz (1933–2004), Azerbaijani poet
 Mammad Mammadov (1920–1945), Azerbaijani soldier
 Mammad Yaqubov (born 1941), Azerbaijani scientist

Surname 
 Ruzbeh Mammad (born 1991), Azerbaijani writer

References 

Azerbaijani-language surnames
Azerbaijani  given names